Cotylopus is a genus of gobies native to streams and rivers in Mauritius, Réunion, Mayotte, and Anjouan in the Comoros, which are all islands in the Western Indian Ocean off Africa.

Species
The recognized species in this genus are:
 Cotylopus acutipinnis Guichenot, 1863
 Cotylopus rubripinnis Keith, Hoareau & P. Bosc, 2005

References

Sicydiinae
Freshwater fish of Africa
Fish of the Comoros
Fauna of Mauritius
Fauna of Mayotte
Vertebrates of Réunion
Taxa named by Alphonse Guichenot